In probability theory, the Palm–Khintchine theorem, the work of Conny Palm and Aleksandr Khinchin, expresses that a large number of renewal processes, not necessarily Poissonian, when combined ("superimposed") will have Poissonian properties.

It is used to generalise the behaviour of users or clients in queuing theory. It is also used in dependability and reliability modelling of computing and telecommunications.

Theorem

According to Heyman and Sobel (2003), the theorem states that the superposition of a large number of independent equilibrium renewal processes, each with a finite intensity, behaves asymptotically like a Poisson process:

Let  be independent renewal processes and  be the superposition of these processes. Denote by  the time between the first and the second renewal epochs in process .

If the following assumptions hold

1) For all sufficiently large : 

2) Given , for every  and sufficiently large :  for all 

See also

 Law of large numbers

References 

Queueing theory
Network performance
Point processes
Probability theorems